The 2022 Howard Bison football team represented Howard University as a member of the Mid-Eastern Athletic Conference (MEAC) in the 2022 NCAA Division I FCS football season. The Bison, led by third-year head coach Larry Scott, played their home games at William H. Greene Stadium.

Previous season

The Bison finished the 2021 season with a record of 3–8, 1–4 MEAC play to finish in a tie for last place.

Schedule

Game summaries

vs. Alabama State

at Hampton

at South Florida

vs. Morehouse

at Yale

Harvard

Delaware State

at Norfolk State

at North Carolina Central

South Carolina State

at Morgan State

References

Howard
Howard Bison football seasons
Mid-Eastern Athletic Conference football champion seasons
Howard Bison football